Spartak Moscow won their fifth consecutive Russian title, and eighth overall.

Overview

Standings

Results

Top goalscorers

Awards 
On December 5 Russian Football Union named its list of 33 top players:

Goalkeepers
  Ruslan Nigmatullin (Lokomotiv Moscow)
  Aleksandr Filimonov (Spartak Moscow)
  Veniamin Mandrykin (Alania)

Sweepers
  Igor Chugainov (Lokomotiv Moscow)
  Dimitri Ananko (Spartak Moscow)
  Aleksei Katulsky (Zenit)

Right backs
  Dmytro Parfenov (Spartak Moscow)
  Jerry-Christian Tchuissé (Chernomorets / Spartak Moscow)
  Gennadiy Nizhegorodov (Lokomotiv Moscow)

Stoppers
  Yuri Drozdov (Lokomotiv Moscow)
  Yevgeni Varlamov (CSKA Moscow)
  Vitali Litvinov (Torpedo Moscow)

Left backs
  Yuri Kovtun (Spartak Moscow)
  Aleksandr Tochilin (Dynamo Moscow)
  Vadim Evseev (Lokomotiv Moscow)

Defensive midfielders
  Viktor Bulatov (Spartak Moscow)
  Elvir Rahimić (Anzhi)
  Maksym Kalynychenko (Spartak Moscow)

Right wingers
  Rolan Gusev (Dynamo Moscow)
  Vasili Baranov (Spartak Moscow)
  Valery Yesipov (Rotor)

Central midfielders
  Yegor Titov (Spartak Moscow)
  Dmitri Loskov (Lokomotiv Moscow)
  Oleksandr Pryzetko (Chernomorets)

Left wingers
  Narvik Sirkhayev (Anzhi)
  Maksim Romaschenko (Dynamo Moscow)
  Artyom Bezrodny (Spartak Moscow)

Right forwards
  Aleksandr Panov (Zenit)
  Maksim Buznikin (Spartak Moscow / Saturn)
  Predrag Ranđelović (Anzhi)

Left forwards
  Sergei Semak (CSKA Moscow)
  Luis Robson (Spartak Moscow)
  Dmitri Kirichenko (Rostselmash)

Medal squads

See also 
 2000 in Russian football

References

External links 
 RSSSF

2000
1
Russia
Russia